Boletus recapitulatus is a species of bolete fungus found in Sikkim in northeastern India.

References

recapitulatus
Fungi described in 2015
Fungi of India